Tyspanodes gracilis is a moth in the family Crambidae. It was described by Inoue in 1982. It is found in Japan.

References

Moths described in 1982
Spilomelinae
Moths of Japan